Serine incorporator 3 is a protein that in humans is encoded by the SERINC3 gene. It has been demonstrated that SERINC3 acts as a retrovirus restriction factor.

Model organisms 

Model organisms have been used in the study of SERINC3 function. A conditional knockout mouse line called Serinc3tm1a(KOMP)Wtsi was generated at the Wellcome Trust Sanger Institute. Male and female animals underwent a standardized phenotypic screen to determine the effects of deletion. Additional screens performed:  - In-depth immunological phenotyping

References

Further reading